Wheelchair basketball at the 2000 Summer Paralympics consisted of men's and women's team events.

Medal table

Medalists

Source: Paralympic.org

Classification
Classification is an important element that will ensure athletes can compete in a fair situation.

A certain committee will give athletes who can take part in this sport an eight-level-score specific to basketball, ranging from 1 to 4.5. Lower scores represent a larger disability. The sum score of all players on the court cannot exceed 14.

Teams 
There will be 12 male teams and 8 female teams taking part in this sport.

Men's

Women's

Competition format
Teams consisted of twelve players, of whom five were on court at any one time. Each player was rated between 0.5 and 4.5 points based on the extent of their disability, with 4.5 representing the least physical limitation. The sum of the rates of all players on court at any time was limited to 14.5 points per team.

Games were played in four periods of ten minutes, with extra time periods of five minutes added as necessary to resolve a tied game.

See also
Basketball at the 2000 Summer Olympics

References

 

 
2000
Wheelchair
2000 in basketball
International basketball competitions hosted by Australia